Monte Plata is the professional male volleyball team representing Monte Plata Province.

History
The team was founded in 2007.

Current volleyball squad
As of December 2008

 Coach:  Luis Gonzalez
 Assistant coach:  Cristian Polanco

References

External links
League Official website

Dominican Republic volleyball clubs
Volleyball clubs established in 2007